The 2011–12 season was Football Club Internazionale Milano's 103rd in existence and 96th consecutive season in the top flight of Italian football. The team competed for the 10th consecutive season in the Champions League, breaking a record for Italian clubs.

Season overview
Massimo Moratti bets on Gian Piero Gasperini, the coach who in 2009 led Genoa to a comeback in UEFA competitions after 20 years. Other hopes have the faces and names of Ricky Álvarez - a winger - and Diego Forlán, a centre-forward bought in order to replace Samuel Eto'o, flown in Russia. Gasperini makes his official debut in Supercoppa Italiana, losing 2–1 to Milan and wasting the only seasonal chance to win a trophy. He is sacked in late September, due to a bad start in domestic league: Inter is defeated by Palermo and Novara, collecting just a draw with Roma. 

Claudio Ranieri takes his place, but is not - at least in first weeks - luckier. Inter wins for the first time at home in October, beating Chievo 1–0. Between December 2011 and January 2012, anyway, the side manages to get a notable comeback: it includes 7 consecutive wins in league, and 8 overall. When this streak is stopped, however, Inter goes on the other extreme and, from 25 January to March 4, never wins a game. In the match against Catania Nerazzurri are losing 2–0 when, encouraged by their fans, manage to recover the gap for a 2–2 final. In the next matchday, the side returns to win: once again, Chievo is the «victim». Ranieri bursts into tears after the match, tears that will be of pain when - 4 days after - Olympique Marseille knocks Inter out of Champions League. Ranieri leads the team for other only 2 matches, being sacked after the 2–0 suffered from Juventus: it was the first derby of Italy hosted in Juventus Stadium. The third, and last, seasonal coach is Andrea Stramaccioni (aged 36): collecting 17 points in 9 final games, he manages to reach a sixth place and the preliminaries of Europa League as result of a hard season.

Kit

Transfers

Summer

In

Out

In/Out

Total spending:  €35,700,000

Total income:  €35,650,000

Net Income:  €50,000

Winter

In

Total spending:  €6,300,000

Out

Total income:  €11,500,000

Net Income:  €5,200,000

Season Net Income:  €5,150,000

Awards 

 Individual

italic: nominated

Players

Squad information

Youth Squad Players

Club

Non-playing staff

Pre-season and friendlies

Competitions

Overview

Serie A

League table

Results summary

Results by round

Matches 
Kickoff times are in CET.

Coppa Italia

Round of 16

Quarter-finals

Supercoppa Italiana

UEFA Champions League

Group stage

Knockout phase

Round of 16

Statistics

Appearances and goals
As of 13 May 2012

|-
! colspan=14 style=background:#dcdcdc; text-align:center| Goalkeepers

|-
! colspan=14 style=background:#dcdcdc; text-align:center| Defenders

|-
! colspan=14 style=background:#dcdcdc; text-align:center| Midfielders

|-
! colspan=14 style=background:#dcdcdc; text-align:center| Forwards

|-
! colspan=14 style=background:#dcdcdc; text-align:center| Players transferred out during the season

|}

Goalscorers

Last updated: 13 May 2012

Injuries during the season

Last updated: July 30, 2011

References

2011-12
Italian football clubs 2011–12 season
2011–12 UEFA Champions League participants seasons